Sõru is a village in Hiiumaa Parish, Hiiu County in northwestern Estonia.

Sõru harbour is located in the neighboring Pärna village. A ferry service operates to Triigi on Saaremaa.

References

Villages in Hiiu County